Dashe District is a suburban district in southwest Kaohsiung City, Taiwan.

History
After the handover of Taiwan from Japan to the Republic of China in 1945, Dashe was organized as a rural township of Kaohsiung County. On 25 December 2010, Kaohsiung County was merged with Kaohsiung City and Dashe was upgraded to a district of the city.

Administrative divisions
The district consists of the villages Jiacheng, Baoshe, Baoan, Dashe, Cuibing, Sannai, Guanyin, Shennong, and Zhongli.

Education
 Morrison Academy Kaohsiung

Junior high schools 
 Kaohsiung Municipal Dashe District Junior High School (高雄市立大社國民中學)

Primary schools 
 Kaohsiung Municipal Dashe District Dashe Primary School (高雄市大社區大社國民小學)
 Kaohsiung Municipal Dashe District Jiacheng Primary School (高雄市大社區嘉誠國民小學)
 Kaohsiung Municipal Dashe District Guanyin Primary School (高雄市大社區觀音國民小學)

Tourist attractions 
 Guanyinshan Dajue Temple
 Mount Guanyin

References

External links 

 

Districts of Kaohsiung